Jerzy Troszczynski (1932–1977) was a Polish photographer and actor who specialised in movie photography.

His photographs are held in the National Library of Poland and the National Film Archive, Poland.

He photographed numerous people involved with Polish cinema including Wieslaw Zdort, Wieńczysław Gliński, Ignacy Machowski, Bronislaw Pawlik, Sylwester Chęciński, Andrzej Kondratiuk, and Daniel Olbrychski.

His photographs appeared in magazines such as Ekran, and Film, and have appeared in exhibitions like The Wild West: A History of Wroclaw’s Avant-Garde (2015)

Troszczynski was awarded the Silver Cross of Merit.

References

External links
 National Film Archive (Poland) biography

1932 births
1977 deaths
Polish photographers
People from Uddevalla Municipality